Nada más que la verdad (Nothing But the Truth) is a game show created by Howard Schultz, an American television producer and owner of Lighthearted Entertainment. It was first aired in Colombia. The hosts asks the contestants a series of 21 increasingly personal and embarrassing questions for a huge jackpot. The format has been exported to 47 countries, and appears in most countries as The Moment of Truth.

Format
Prior to the show, a contestant is hooked up to a polygraph and asked between 50 and 80 questions. Without knowing the results of the polygraph test, he or she is asked 21 of those same questions again on the program, each becoming more personal in nature. If the contestant answers honestly as confirmed by the polygraph, he or she moves on to the next question. A person may stop at any time before any question is asked and collect the money they have won. Honestly answering all 21 questions wins the jackpot. If the participant is found to be lying, he or she loses everything and the game is over.

International versions

Controversy
The Colombian version was cancelled in October 2007 after a female contestant named Rosa Maria Solano was asked "¿Usted le pagó a un sicario para mandar matar a su marido?", meaning, "Did you pay a hit man to have your husband killed?" and she answered "Sí", meaning, "yes" to the question. (The person she hired tipped off her husband, who then fled.) She later walked away with 50 million Colombian pesos, or about US$25,000.

References

Television game shows
2000s game shows

ar:لحظة الحقيقة
es:Nada más que la verdad
ka:სიმართლის დრო
nl:Het Moment Van De Waarheid
pt:Nada Além da Verdade
pt:O Momento da Verdade
sl:Trenutek resnice
sv:Sanningens ögonblick
ru:Детектор лжи (телепередача)